Cornelius Warren ("Chip") Grafton (June 16, 1909 – January 31, 1982) was an American crime novelist. He was born and raised in China, where his parents were working as missionaries. He was educated at Presbyterian College in Clinton, South Carolina, studying law and journalism, and became a municipal bond attorney in Louisville, Kentucky.

The hero of his first two mystery novels (The Rat Began to Gnaw the Rope and The Rope Began to Hang the Butcher) was a lawyer named Gilmore Henry. Using the first two lines of a nursery rhyme as the titles of his first two novels suggested that other Gilmore Henry novels would follow, but none did. (A partial manuscript of a third novel, The Butcher Began to Kill the Ox, is known to exist.) Henry did not appear in Grafton's two subsequent novels.

Honors and awards
The Rat Began to Gnaw the Rope won the 1943 Mary Roberts Rinehart Award. It was one of the first titles chosen to be reprinted in the Library of Congress Crime Classics series.

Personal life
In World War II, Grafton served with distinction as a military deception officer in the India-Burma theater.  Grafton was married to Vivian Harnsberger, and they had two daughters, Sue and Ann. Sue Grafton (1940-2017) was also a writer and is famous for her "Alphabet Series" of crime novels. C. W. Grafton died on January 31, 1982, at the age of 72. Only four months later, Sue published the first book of the series.

C. W. Grafton's law partner, Spencer Harper Jr., named his younger son Grafton Sharpe Harper after him.

Bibliography 
The Rat Began to Gnaw the Rope (1943)
The Rope Began to Hang the Butcher (1944)
My Name Is Christopher Nagel (1947)
Beyond a Reasonable Doubt (1950)

References

1909 births
1982 deaths
American mystery writers
20th-century American novelists
Writers from Louisville, Kentucky
American male novelists
Novelists from Kentucky
20th-century American male writers